Aashu is a male given name of Ancient Indian origin and means"Brightest Among All Humans". People with the name are likely to be Hindu by religion. Aashu is a name of Lord Shiva. In English, the word means "Morning Star".

Indian given names